Roshni Walia (born 20 September 2001) is an Indian actress. Walia began her career with television advertisements and firstly acted in television shows Main Lakshmi Tere Aangan Ki. She is also known for her work in Bharat Ka Veer Putra – Maharana Pratap as Maharani Ajabde and Tara Mane in Tara From Satara on Sony TV.

Early life
Roshni Walia was born on 20 September 2001 in Allahabad, Uttar Pradesh, India. She lives in Mumbai. Her mother is Sweety Walia. She has an older sister, Noor Walia. Walia's maternal grandfather was an army officer.

Career

Walia began her career with television commercials. Thereafter, Walia played in Life OK drama series Main Lakshmi Tere Aangan Ki, in it she played the role of Jiyana. Later, Walia was cast in Life OK's another drama series Ringa Ringa Roses, she played the daughter of Samir Soni's character.

In 2014, Walia played the role of young Maharani Ajabde Punwar, the first wife of Maharana Pratap in Bharat Ka Veer Putra – Maharana Pratap. She was nominated for the Best Child Actor - Female in 13th Indian Telly Awards 2014. In December 2014, Walia featured in the third season of youth crime drama series Gumrah: End of Innocence. The show aired on Channel V India, in which she played the role of Aarohi.

In 2015, Walia portrayed the character of Survi in Zee TV's Yeh Vaada Raha.

In 2019, she played Tara Mane in Tara From Satara on Sony TV.

Filmography

Films

Television

Music videos

Awards and nominations

References

External links

 

Living people
2001 births
Indian child actresses
Actresses from Allahabad
Indian soap opera actresses
21st-century Indian actresses
Indian television actresses
Ahluwalia